Frank G. McCormick (November 5, 1894 – March 24, 1976) was the first South Dakotan to play professional football. He played from 1920 until 1921, with the Akron Pros and the Cincinnati Celts of the American Professional Football Association (the league changed the name to the National Football League in 1922). Originally a guard, Frank was made a wingback by the Pros. He won an AFPA championship with Akron in 1920.

Before playing professional football, McCormick played college football at the University of South Dakota. He played with the Coyotes from 1912 until 1916. In 1973, McCormick was inducted into the Coyote Sports Hall of Fame. He was also 1 of 995 NFL personnel who served in the United States Armed Forces during World War II.

References

External links
 

1894 births
1976 deaths
Akron Pros players
American football halfbacks
American men's basketball players
United States Army personnel of World War II
Basketball players from Nebraska
Cincinnati Celts players
Illinois Fighting Illini football coaches
Minnesota Golden Gophers athletic directors
Minnesota Golden Gophers baseball coaches
Minnesota Golden Gophers football coaches
People from Charles Mix County, South Dakota
People from Genoa, Nebraska
Players of American football from Nebraska
Players of American football from South Dakota
South Dakota Coyotes baseball players
South Dakota Coyotes football coaches
South Dakota Coyotes football players
South Dakota Coyotes men's basketball players
Sioux Falls Cougars football coaches
United States Army colonels